Ida Victoria Nowakowska-Herndon (born December 7, 1990) is a Polish-American actress, dancer and television presenter.

Early life and career
She studied in New York City at the Professional Performing Arts School and Steps on Broadway and performed at the Metropolitan Opera. In 2007, she was a finalist on the first season of the Polish version of So You Think You Can Dance and reached the Top 10 in the competition. Graduated from the School of Theater, Film and Television from University of California, Los Angeles with a degree in theater and political science. She returned as a judge for the ninth season in 2016.

In 2019, she was a judge of the first season of Dance Dance Dance broadcast on TVP2 in Poland and is the host of Poland's Junior Bake Off. She will co-host the next edition of The Voice Kids that will premiere in February 2021, replacing Barbara Kurdej-Szatan in the role. On August 22, 2019, it was announced that Nowakowska would host the Junior Eurovision Song Contest 2019, alongside Aleksander Sikora and Roksana Węgiel, in Gliwice on November 24.

On October 7, 2020, it was announced that Nowakowska would again host the contest, this time alongside Rafał Brzozowski and Małgorzata Tomaszewska, in Warsaw on November 29. Ida is one of three presenters in the history of the Junior Eurovision Song Contest that has hosted the competition twice - previously only presenters from the Netherlands and Ukraine did. She is also the first to conduct the competition twice in a row.

Filmography

References

External links 

 

Polish actresses
Polish female dancers
Living people
Actresses from Warsaw
Polish television presenters
Polish women television presenters
1990 births
Polish emigrants to the United States